Aniculus is a genus of aquatic hermit crab of the family Calcinidae.

The following species are currently accepted within Aniculus:
 Aniculus aniculus (J. C. Fabricius, 1787) 
 Aniculus elegans Stimpson, 1858
 Aniculus erythraeus Forest, 1984
 Aniculus hopperae McLaughlin & Hoover, 1996
 Aniculus maximus Edmondson, 1952
 Aniculus miyakei Forest, 1984
 Aniculus retipes Lewinsohn, 1982
 Aniculus sibogae Forest, 1984
 Aniculus ursus (Olivier, 1812)

References 

Hermit crabs
Crustaceans described in 1852
Decapod genera